Marchesinia mackaii, or MacKay's pouncewort, is a species of leafy liverwort.

Description
Marchesinia mackaii grows in colonies of flattened worm-like shoots covering rock surfaces.

Shoots are usually black and are up to 5 cm long and 4 mm wide. The leaves are rounded with a smaller inflated and toothed  postical lobe. The underleaves are round and entire.

Distribution
Marchesinia mackaii is global in its distribution.

In Europe it is strongly western and somewhat southern.

Ecology
Marchesinia mackaii grows primarily on shaded basic rocks, typically vertical faces within woodland. It can occasionally be found on trees especially European yew (Taxus baccata)

According to Ratcliffe's account of oceanic bryophytes bordering the Atlantic, M. mackaii is  classified as a Southern Atlantic  species. M. mackaii is consistently calcicolous in its choice of substrate.

Cultivation and uses
The plant is not known to be widely cultivated.

Gallery

References

External links
 Global Biodiversity Information Facility : Marchesinia mackaii
 British Bryological Society Field Guide Online Pages : Marchesinia mackaii

Further reading
 Edwards, Sean R. (2012). English Names for British Bryophytes. British Bryological Society Special Volume. 5 (4 ed.). Wootton, Northampton: British Bryological Society. . ISSN 0268-8034.
 Macvicar, S.M. (1926). The Student's Handbook of British Hepatics. Wheldon & Wesley Ltd. London.
 Ratcliffe, D.A. (1968). An Ecological Account Of Atlantic Bryophytes in the British Isles. New Phytol 67: 365.
 Smith, A. J. E. (1991) The Liverworts of Britain and Ireland. Cambridge University Press.
 Watson, E. V. (1981) British Mosses and Liverworts: An Introductory Work. Cambridge University Press.

mackaii
Flora of Europe